WCW/New Japan Supershow I, (known as Starrcade in Tokyo Dome in Japan) was a professional wrestling pay-per-view (PPV) event that took place on March 21, 1991 in the Tokyo Dome in Tokyo, Japan. It was co-promoted by New Japan Pro-Wrestling (NJPW), who hosted the event, and the US-Based World Championship Wrestling (WCW), which supplied a number of the wrestlers on the show. The event was the inaugural WCW/New Japan Supershow.

The event was viewed by 64,500 people live in attendance in Japan and later shown in America on a PPV in April, 1991. Several of the matches on the show were not included in the PPV broadcast, held for the benefit of the crowd in attendance only. The WCW/NJPW Supershows were part of a small group of WCW-produced PPVs not included in the "on demand" features when the WWE Network was launched in 2014.

Storylines
The event featured eleven professional wrestling matches and two pre-show matches that involved different wrestlers from pre-existing scripted feuds and storylines. Wrestlers portrayed villains, heroes, or less distinguishable characters in the scripted events that built tension and culminated in a wrestling match or series of matches.

Event

Lex Luger was originally scheduled to face Riki Choshu, but Luger's contract with WCW did not require him to wrestle in Japan.

The main event match between Ric Flair and Tatsumi Fujinami was presented very differently in the United States and in Japan. During the show it was announced that Ric Flair's NWA World Heavyweight Championship was on the line, but not the WCW World Heavyweight Championship, in the US those were considered the same championship and represented by one belt. The PPV announcers stated that Fujinami's IWGP Heavyweight Championship was also on the line in the match even though no such mention was made during the introductions. The outcome of the match was also presented differently, to the Japanese crowd Fujinami defeated Flair by pinfall (counted by New Japan referee Tiger Hattori, who had replaced NWA referee Bill Alfonso after a spot in which Alfonso was knocked out) and thus won the NWA World Heavyweight Championship. The title change was ignored in the US, claiming that Fujinami had been disqualified for throwing Ric Flair over the top rope during the time Alfonso had been knocked out and thus did not win the match. A later rematch between the two at SuperBrawl I saw Flair regain the NWA title, but in all promotional material produced by WCW it was billed as a successful title defense against Fujinami.

Reception

Dave Meltzer reviewed the event in the Wrestling Observer Newsletter after attending it live. He was largely positive, crediting it for having a great presentation for the main event championship match and praising matches such as the tag match between The Steiner Brothers and the team of Hiroshi Hase and Kensuke Sasaki, the six-man tag, the match between Jushin Liger and Akira Nogami, and the final two matches of the night. He argued the show would have been more effective for WCW if it was aired in the United States on television as a Clash of the Champions rather than as a pay-per-view.

Aftermath

The ending to the main event was not well received in Japan, as the crowd was not used "dirty" finishes like the Dusty finish used in the main event. Meltzer reprinted comments from Japanese newspapers covering the situation that contained comments like "This WCW dirty trick finish is nothing but trouble. They've already ruined their company at home with it and now they're going to ruin our wrestling with it."

Fujinami went on to face Flair again in the main event of SuperBrawl I in May of that year in a match for both the NWA and WCW World Heavyweight Championships.

Results

See also

1991 in professional wrestling

References

1991 World Championship Wrestling pay-per-view events
March 1991 events in Asia
Events in Tokyo
1991 in Tokyo
WCW/New Japan Supershow